HD 38282 (R144, BAT99-118, Brey 89) is a massive spectroscopic binary star in the Tarantula Nebula (Large Magellanic Cloud), consisting of two hydrogen-rich Wolf-Rayet stars.

R144 is located near the R136 cluster at the center of NGC 2070 and may have been ejected from it after an encounter with another massive binary. It shares a common X-ray cavity with the R146 (HD 269926) and R147 (HD 38344) Wolf-Rayet star systems.

Both components of R144 are detected in the spectrum and both are WNh stars, very hot stars with strong emission lines due to their strong stellar winds.  The orbit has not been determined, but is likely to be between two and six months long, possibly more if it is eccentric.  The primary, slightly hotter, star is observed to be the less massive of the two.

Each star is amongst the most luminous known, but the exact parameters of each has not been determined.

References 

Stars in the Large Magellanic Cloud
Dorado (constellation)
Tarantula Nebula
Wolf–Rayet stars
Extragalactic stars
CPD−69 462
038282
Spectroscopic binaries
J05385338-6902007
Large Magellanic Cloud
TIC objects